Maria Sharapova was the defending champion, but chose not to participate.

Andrea Petkovic won the title, after Marion Bartoli retired in the final with the scoreline at 6–4, 1–0.

Seeds

Draw

Finals

Top half

Bottom half

Qualifying

Seeds

Qualifiers

Qualifying draw

First qualifier

Second qualifier

Third qualifier

Fourth qualifier

References
 Main Draw
 Qualifying Draw

2011 WTA Tour
2011,Singles
2011 in French tennis